Francesco Nerli, iuniore (1645–1720) was a Roman Catholic cardinal.

Biography
On 12 Mar 1690, he was consecrated bishop by Francesco Nerli (iuniore), Cardinal-Priest of San Matteo in Merulana.

References

1645 births
1720 deaths
18th-century Italian cardinals
People from Sarzana
Apostolic Nuncios to the Kingdom of Naples